Keserwan may refer to the following:

Kisrawan, a historical region in Mount Lebanon
Keserwan District, the administrative district in the Keserwan-Jbeil Governorate of modern Lebanon.
Keserwan-Jbeil Governorate, a governorate in modern Lebanon.